I Remember You is an album by pianist Hank Jones recorded in Paris in 1977 for the Black & Blue label.

Reception

Allmusic awarded the album 4 stars stating "this outing features pianist Hank Jones emphasizing the swing side of his flexible musical personality. ...A fine set". The Penguin Guide to Jazz described this and Bluesette from the same label as having "a soft and occasionally plangent quality which is highly appealing".

Track listing
 "I Remember You" (Victor Schertzinger, Johnny Mercer) – 2:06
 "Young No More" (Frank Metis) – 5:52
 "You Took Advantage of Me" (Richard Rodgers, Lorenz Hart) – 3:12
 "Love Walked In" (George Gershwin, Ira Gershwin) – 4:58
 "Dat Dere" (Bobby Timmons) – 7:26
 "I'll Be Around" (Alec Wilder) – 4:48
 "Let's Fall in Love" (Harold Arlen, Ted Koehler) – 2:45
 "Like Someone in Love" (Jimmy Van Heusen, Johnny Burke) – 5:22
 "Theme from Jobim" (Gerry Mulligan) – 7:27 Bonus track on CD reissue
 "It's the Talk of the Town"(Jerry Livingston, Marty Symes) – 3:14 Bonus track on CD reissue
 "Yours Is My Heart Alone" (Franz Lehár) – 6:28 Bonus track on CD reissue
 "Come to Me" (Milt Jackson) – 6:23 Bonus track on CD reissue

Personnel 
Hank Jones – piano
George Duvivier – bass
Oliver Jackson – drums
Tracks 11 & 12 were recorded on July 18, 1978 in Brignoles, France and feature Alan Dawson as the drummer - originally released on Foggy Day

References 

1977 albums
Hank Jones albums
Black & Blue Records albums